Samuel Cockroft (13 May 1864 – 1 January 1955) was a New Zealand rugby union player. A hooker, Cockroft represented Wellington, Manawatu and Hawke's Bay at a provincial level, and was a member of the New Zealand national side, the All Blacks, in 1893 and 1894. He played 12 matches for the All Blacks but did not play any internationals.  He also played for Queensland in 1895 and 1896.

References

1864 births
1955 deaths
New Zealand rugby union players
New Zealand international rugby union players
Wellington rugby union players
Manawatu rugby union players
Hawke's Bay rugby union players
Rugby union players from Invercargill
Rugby union hookers